Anne Leaton (born July 13, 1932 - January 25, 2016) was a novelist, short story writer, and poet whose works have been published in England and America and whose radio plays have been broadcast on the BBC.

Life
Born in Cleburne, Texas, she studied English and creative writing at Indiana University and Texas Tech University and was a Fulbright scholar to Germany, after which she spent twenty years traveling and working in Europe, the Middle East, South Africa, and Canada.

She received numerous awards for her fiction and poetry, including twice being the recipient of an O. Henry Award for her short stories. Leaton's work has been compared to other writers whose focus has been primarily upon social mores and human foibles—specifically such novelists and short story writers as Jane Austen, Henry James, and John Cheever.

She lived in Fort Worth, Texas.

Works

Novels

Short stories

Radio play

Anthologies

References

Further reading
Virginia Blain, Patricia Clements, and Isobel Grundy (eds), A Feminist Companion to Literature in English: Women Writers from the Middle Ages to the Present,. Yale University Press, 1990.

1932 births
2016 deaths
20th-century American novelists
American women novelists
American women short story writers
American lesbian writers
American LGBT novelists
American LGBT poets
LGBT people from Texas
Texas Tech University alumni
Novelists from Texas
20th-century American women writers
20th-century American short story writers
21st-century American LGBT people
21st-century American women writers